

Group A

Head coach:  Sergio Vatta

Head coach:  Roy Rees

Head coach:  Zhu Guanghu

 Only 17 players in China squad. (18) Xie Hui FW 02/14/1975 Shangai Shenhua China.

Head coach:  Reinaldo Merlo

Group B

Head coach:  Joachim Fickert

Head coach:  José Roberto Avila

Head coach:  Les Scheinflug

Head coach:  Juan Manuel Álvarez

Group C

Head coach:  Abdel Aziz Suliman

Head coach:  Ishao Benjamin Zia

Head coach:  Fritz Bischoff

Head coach:  Júlio César Leal

Group D

Head coach:  Otto Pfister

Head coach:  Manuel Rodríguez

Head coach:  Jesús Rodríguez Prado

Head coach:  Juan Santisteban

Fifa U-17 World Championship Squads, 1991
FIFA U-17 World Cup squads